The 1905 Geneva Covenanters football team was an American football team that represented Geneva College as an independent during the 1905 college football season. In their first season under head coach Archibald Leech, the Covenanters compiled a 4–6 record.

Schedule

References

Geneva
Geneva Golden Tornadoes football seasons
Geneva Covenanters football